Brain-specific Homeobox is a protein that in humans is encoded by the BSX gene.

Structure and Expression Pattern 
Bsx is an evolutionary highly conserved homeodomain containing transcription factor that belongs to the ANTP-class. In mouse it has been shown to be expressed in the telencephalic septum, pineal gland, the mammillary bodies and arcuate nucleus.

Function in the Hypothalamus 
In the hypothalamic arcuate nucleus, Bsx has been demonstrated to be necessary for normal expression levels of the two orexigenic neuropeptides Agouti-related peptide and Neuropeptide Y.

Function in the Pineal Gland 
In the pineal gland of the clawed frog Xenopus, Bsx is expressed following the circadian rhythm and controls photoreceptor cell differentiation. In zebrafish Bsx is required for normal development of all cell types within the pineal gland, including melatonin-releasing pinealocytes, photoreceptor cells and leftwards migrating parapineal cells, which in zebrafish are crucial for the establishment of brain asymmetry.

References

Brain
Proteins
Transcription factors
Genes
Molecular biology